20/20 is the twentieth album by the American jazz group Spyro Gyra, released in 1997 by GRP Records.

Track listing 
 "The Unwritten Letter" (Jay Beckenstein) – 5:07
 "Ruled by Venus" (Julio Fernandez) – 4:49
 "20/20" (Beckenstein) – 5:56
 "Three Sisters" (Beckenstein) – 4:41
 "Sweet Baby James" (James Taylor) – 3:51
 "The Deep End" (Scott Ambush) – 6:35
 "Together" (Fernandez) – 4:31
 "Dark Eyed Lady" (Jeremy Wall) – 4:55
 "South American Sojourn" (Joel Rosenblatt) – 4:12
 "Rockaway to Sunset" (Tom Schuman) – 5:48

Personnel 

Spyro Gyra
 Jay Beckenstein – alto saxophone, soprano saxophone, tenor saxophone 
 Tom Schuman – keyboards
 Julio Fernandez – acoustic guitar, electric guitar 
 Scott Ambush – bass guitar
 Joel Rosenblatt – drums
 Manolo Badrena – percussion

Additional personnel
 Bobby Allende – percussion (1, 9)
 Dave Samuels – vibraphone (8, 9), marimba (8, 9)
 Chris Botti – trumpet (6, 10)
 No Sweat Horns – brass
 Scott Krietzer – tenor saxophone, piccolo flute (9)
 Randy Andos – trombone, bass trombone 
 Barry Danielian – trumpet, flugelhorn, horn arrangements 
 Gabriela Anders – vocals (7, 8)
 Doris Eugenio – vocals (7, 8)
 Eugene Ruffolo – vocals (7, 8)

Production 
 Jay Beckenstein – producer 
 Jeremy Wall – assistant producer
 Tom Schuman – assistant producer
 Julio Fernandez – assistant producer
 Doug Oberkircher – recording, mixing 
 Kristin Koerner – assistant engineer, mix assistant 
 Scott Hull – mastering
 Kevin Gaor – art direction, design

Studios
 Recorded and Mixed at BearTracks Studios (Suffern, New York).
 Mastered at Masterdisk (New York City, New York).

References

External links
 Spyro Gyra-20/20 at AllMusic
 Spyro Gyra official web site

1997 albums
Spyro Gyra albums
GRP Records albums